The Tarleton State Texans (formerly the Tarleton State Texans and TexAnns), also known as the Tarleton Texans, are the athletic teams that represent Tarleton State University of Stephenville, Texas in NCAA Division I intercollegiate sports. Before Tarleton State became a four-year institution in 1961, they were known as the "Plowboys". The Texans compete as members of the Western Athletic Conference (WAC) for 13 of their 14 varsity sports. During the school's four-year transition to full D-I membership, set to end in July 2024, Tarleton has planned to add several sports, with women's soccer the first to be confirmed and the team's launch started in 2022.

Before joining the WAC in July 2020, Tarleton State had been a member of the NCAA Division II Lone Star Conference (LSC). It had two separate stints in the LSC, first from 1968–69 to 1975–76 and then from 1994–95 to 2019–20. Tarleton was also a founding member of the Texas Intercollegiate Athletic Association (TIAA) in the 1976–77 school year and remained in that league until the 1990–91 school year. From 1991–92 to 1993–94, Tarleton played as an independent. The Texans began their transition to Division I upon joining the WAC. Tarleton's football program competes at the second level of D-I football, the Football Championship Subdivision (FCS); it played its first D-I season as an independent before the WAC reinstated football in fall 2021.

Women's nickname history
The first TSU women's varsity teams, introduced in 1968–69, actually played under the "Texans" nickname. However, due to female athletes' wish to play under a distinctive nickname, the school changed it the following school year, though a consistent spelling was not immediately adopted—"Texanns", "Tex-Anns", and "TexAnns" were used interchangeably until 1972–73, when "TexAnns" was officially settled on. During the 2018–19 school year, two players and a student manager in the women's basketball program started a campaign to change the women's nickname back to "Texans". After receiving buy-in from virtually all female athletes, plus much of the university community, TSU announced in January 2019 that women's teams would once again be known as "Texans" starting in 2019–20.

Facilities
 Football: Memorial Stadium
 Baseball: Cecil Ballow Baseball Complex 
 Softball: Tarleton Softball Complex
 Basketball/volleyball: Wisdom Gym
 Soccer: Tarleton Soccer Complex

Varsity sports

List of teams

Men's sports
 Baseball
 Basketball
 Cross country
 Football
 Track and field

Women's sports
 Basketball
 Cross country
 Golf
 Soccer
 Softball
 Tennis
 Track and field
 Volleyball

References

External links